Jeong Woo-In (Hanja: 鄭愚仁; born 1 February 1988) is a South Korean footballer who plays as defender for FC Pocheon in the K3 League.

Club career
Jeong began his senior career with National League side Yongin City FC in 2010, where he appeared in 22 games and scored 5 goals.

Jeong was selected in the 2nd round of the 2011 K-League Draft by Gwangju FC.

References

External links 

1988 births
Living people
South Korean footballers
Gwangju FC players
Gangwon FC players
Chungju Hummel FC players
K League 1 players
K League 2 players
FC Pocheon players
Association football defenders
People from Yangsan
Sportspeople from South Gyeongsang Province